The Second Division of ascent or Second Division of Guatemala is an institution of professional sports character founded in 1992 and affiliated to the National Federation of football Guatemala, which is organized by the necessity of mass sports of the professional football in Guatemala leading him to have clubs representing it in all the Department of the country, with 40 teams in the different geographical zones of our territory to date.

They constitute one of the largest and best organized sports forces in what refers to professional football in Guatemala, forming a professional sports organization which emerged several sports talent of the Guatemalan football.

Competition system
As in the National League and First division, will play two tournaments, the Apertura and the Clausura champion and runner-up of the opening has average ticket won the First division and the champion and runner-up of the concluding wins the other half ticket, if they repeat the same teams in the Clausura, automatically amount, if not so face in each other, the champion against the runner-up, the winning team is and the losers get once more in a Repechage, faced between ifto get to the third classified in the First division.

Segunda División de Ascenso teams

Grupo A

Grupo B

Grupo C

Grupo D

Grupo E

External links
 Liga Segunda División de Ascenso 
 SERLOGS 

3
Gua